Norma Michaels (March 13, 1924 – January 11, 2020) was an American television and film character actress, with a career spanning six decades from her debut in 1954 until 2018. She was best known of the latter for her portraying of elderly woman on the small screen as "Josephine" on the CBS sitcom The King of Queens, she briefly worked as counselor/therapist during the 1980s.

Born and raised in Los Angeles, she got her break appearing on The Jack Benny Show. Her many television credits included Modern Family, Highway to Heaven, The George Gobel Show, Dr. Kildare, Playing House, 2 Broke Girls and Everybody Loves Raymond. Her film roles included Easy A, Wedding Crashers and Bad Arse, and she also appeared in Hello, My Name Is Doris, where she played the mother of Sally Field's character.

Filmography

References

External links

1920s births
2020 deaths
Actresses from Los Angeles
Actresses from Palm Springs, California
American television actresses
20th-century American actresses
21st-century American actresses
Date of birth missing